Thornton is a historic family farm located at Chestertown, Kent County, Maryland, United States. The farm is located on a  plot on Morgan's Creek, a tributary of the Chester River. The main house is a -story, five-bay brick house, constructed about 1788, and principally Georgian in style. A -story kitchen wing is attached to the west gable end.  Also on the property are an early-20th-century dairy barn, a late-19th-century animal barn, a second-half-19th-century granary, a smokehouse, and two sheds. The farm has been owned and operated by the same family for nearly 300 years.

Thornton was listed on the National Register of Historic Places in 2005.

References

External links
, including photo from 1977, at Maryland Historical Trust

Chestertown, Maryland
Houses on the National Register of Historic Places in Maryland
Houses in Kent County, Maryland
Houses completed in 1788
Georgian architecture in Maryland
1788 establishments in Maryland
Historic districts on the National Register of Historic Places in Maryland
National Register of Historic Places in Kent County, Maryland